Richard Trevor Fromont (born 17 September 1969) is a former New Zealand rugby union player. A lock, Fromont represented Auckland and Counties Manukau at a provincial level, and was a member of the New Zealand national side, the All Blacks, in 1993 and 1995. He played ten matches for the All Blacks but did not play any internationals.

References

1969 births
Living people
Rugby union players from Auckland
Auckland rugby union players
Counties Manukau rugby union players
New Zealand rugby union players
New Zealand international rugby union players
SU Agen Lot-et-Garonne players
New Zealand expatriates in France
Expatriate rugby union players in France
Rugby union locks